Psychedelic microdosing is the practice of using sub-threshold doses (microdoses) of serotonergic psychedelic drugs in an attempt to improve creativity, boost physical energy level, promote emotional balance, increase performance on problems-solving tasks and to treat anxiety, depression and addiction.  The practice of microdosing has become more widespread in the 21st century with more people claiming long-term benefits from the practice.

Techniques 

The two most common psychedelic drugs used in microdosing are lysergic acid diethylamide (LSD) and psilocybin (psychoactive mushrooms). Other psychedelics that have been used for microdosing include 1P-LSD, mescaline (for example San Pedro cactus), Methallylescaline, 4-AcO-DMT, 4-HO-MET, 4-HO-MiPT, 2,5-dimethoxy-4-bromoamphetamine, 2C-B, 2C-D, 2C-E and lysergic acid amide. A microdose is usually 1/20 to 1/10 of an active dose of a psychedelic drug. Volumetric liquid dosing can make it easier to measure such small doses of LSD. Safety considerations in microdosing with psilocybin include activation of serotonin receptors.

Prevalence and demographics 
Both gender and education have an effect on the prevalence of microdosing. An online survey found that out of 2,437 individuals, 13% had previously practiced microdosing and 4% were currently microdosing. Females (n=100) were about half as likely as males (n=188) to report microdosing.  The average age of these individuals who had previous microdosing experience, both male and female, was 33.26. Education and income was highly correlated with microdosing experience. Participants who reported microdosing were more likely to have lower income levels (<$50,000) and lower levels of education. No particular type of employment was associated with microdosing.

Another anonymous online survey drew a sample of microdosers from the online forum Reddit. The survey was primarily targeted at current or past users to examine demographics, practice, and mental health comorbidity. Microdosers and non-microdosers showed no statistical difference in terms of age, sexual orientation, social class, or highest completed formal education. Significant differences were found in gender and religious affiliation with microdosers more likely to be male and reporting lower rates of religious affiliation. The majority of microdosers reported the use of LSD or psilocybin as their substance of choice and followed a one-day-on, two-days-off schedule. Despite no significant differences in psychiatric history, microdosers were less likely to report a history of anxiety or substance use disorder. Statistical analyses showed that users were about five times more likely to report recent substance use, excluding caffeine, alcohol, and prescription medications, compared to non-microdosers.

Motivation 
Research that examines the motives of users is narrative or survey-based. People’s reasons for microdosing are both physically and psychologically oriented. A study investigated the motives for microdosing with psychedelics in 1,116 users through an online questionnaire. Common reasons given by respondents were performance enhancement, mood enhancement, symptom relief, and curiosity. Almost half of respondents claimed that they microdosed to go to work.

Another study relied on data collected from interviews with thirty people who had previously microdosed.  Responses from users emphasized their role as conventional citizens, distancing themselves from traditional drug users.  Motivations were similar to those of the previous study; reasons for microdosing included mood enhancement, greater productivity, and increase in sociability. Although this sample is not representative of the population of users, the results still provide insights about the motivation to microdose.

Research 
Since research on the topic of microdosing with psychedelics is fairly new, there are sure to be more studies focusing on double-blind, randomized experiments in order to determine if these doses have any benefit to normal functioning as proclaimed by some users.

See also 
 Microdosing
 Nootropic
 Psychedelic therapy
 Neuropsychopharmacology

References 

Nootropics
Psychedelia
Psychedelic drug research